Roger Trézel (11 May 1918 – 3 November 1986) was a French bridge player and writer. He and his long-time regular partner Pierre Jaïs were the first two of ten players who have won the Triple Crown of Bridge. Their achievement was unique for more than twenty years and they accomplished it on the earliest occasion possible. Having played on the France team that won the 1956 Bermuda Bowl representing Europe against  the United States, they won the inaugural renditions of both premier World Bridge Federation quadrennial events, the 1960 World Team Olympiad and the 1962 World Open Pairs Championship. Trézel and Jaïs also won the Sunday Times Invitational pairs tournament in 1963.

They used a canapé system, generally bidding the second-longest suit first, and their becoming one of the world's strongest pairs "demonstrated the effectiveness" of the style. Their partnership was terminated only by Trézel's late 1986 death in France. Alan Truscott then called it "one of the greatest partnerships in the history of the game" and two years later asserted that many European cognoscenti of 30 years earlier would have called them the "world's greatest partnership".

Trézel wrote several bridge books including the Master Bridge Series with Terence Reese.

Born in Orléans, France to Pierre Trézel and Marie Prunier, he died in Paris at the age of 68.

Publications with Terence Reese
Those Extra Chances in Bridge
 1978: Frederick Fell Publishers (New York), 64p., 
 1978: Ward Lock (London), 64p., 
 1978, 1986: Victor Gollancz (London) in association with Peter Crawley, 64p., 

Master the Odds in Bridge
 1979, 1986: Victor Gollancz (London) in association with Peter Crawley, Master Bridge Series, 79p., 
 1979: F. Fell (New York), 79p., 

Snares and Swindles in Bridge
 1976: Frederick Fell Publishers (New York), Master Bridge Series, 64p., 
 1976: Ward Lock (London), 64p., 
 1979, 1986: Victor Gollancz (London) in association with Peter Crawley, 64p., 

The Art of Defense in Bridge
 1979: Frederick Fell Publishers (New York), Master Bridge Series, 79p., 
 1979, 1988: Victor Gollancz (London) in association with Peter Crawley, 79p., 

Imaginative Cardplay
 2014: Master Point Press (Toronto). 248p. . This publication is a compendium of the four above-noted, each revised and updated.

'Elimination Play in Bridge 1976: Frederick Fell Publishers (New York), Master Bridge Series, 77p., 
 1976: Ward Lock (London), 77p., 
 1979, 1986: Victor Gollancz (London) in association with Peter Crawley, 77p., When to Duck When to Win in Bridge 1978: Frederick Fell Publishers (New York), 64p., 
 1978: Ward Lock (London), 64p., 
 1978, 1988: Victor Gollancz (London) in association with Peter Crawley, 64p., Blocking and Unblocking Plays in Bridge 1976: Frederick Fell Publishers (New York), Master Bridge Series, 64p., 
 1976: Ward Lock (London), 64p., 
 1976, 1979: Victor Gollancz (London) in association with Peter Crawley, 64p., Safety Plays in Bridge 1976: Frederick Fell Publishers (New York), Master Bridge Series, 63p., 
 1976: Ward Lock (London), 63p., 
 1976, 1990: Victor Gollancz (London) in association with Peter Crawley, 63p., Accurate Cardplay 2014: Master Point Press (Toronto). 232p. . This publication is a compendium of the four above-noted, each revised and updated.The Mistakes You Make at Bridge''
 1984, 1989: Victor Gollancz (London) in association with Peter Crawley, Master Bridge Series, 168p., 
 1992: Reprint: Houghton Mifflin (Boston) in association with Peter Crawley, 
 1994: New Edition: Gollancz (London), 168p., 
 2006: Revised edition by Ron Klinger: Cassell (London) in association with Peter Crawley, 160p.,

References

External links
 
 
  (including 6 "from old catalog")

1918 births
1986 deaths
Contract bridge writers
French contract bridge players
Bermuda Bowl players
Sportspeople from Orléans